Anastasie is a French feminine given name derived from the Ancient Greek name Anastasíā. Notable people with this name include the following:

Anastasie Brown (1826 – 1918), American Roman Catholic nun
Anastasie Crimca (c. 1550 – 1629), Romanian clergyman, calligrapher, illuminator, and writer
Anastasie Fătu (1816 – 1886), Romanian physician, naturalist, philanthropist and political figure
Mother Marie-Anastasie (1833 – 1878), Dominican saints

See also

Anastase
Anastasi (surname)
Anastasia

Notes

French feminine given names